Musa Dağı (Mountain of Moses) is a mountain near Adrasan in Antalya Province, Turkey. The Lycian Way long-distance trail runs over the western slope of the mountain.

Geography 
The mountain lies close to the shore, northeast of Adrasan.

References

Sources 

 

Landforms of Antalya Province
Mountains of Turkey